The Progress of Civilization is a marble pediment above the entrance to the Senate wing of the United States Capitol building designed by the sculptor Thomas Crawford. An allegorical personification of America stands at the center of the pediment. To her right, a white woodsman clears the wilderness inhabited by a Native American boy, father, mother, and child. The left side of the pediment depicts a soldier, a merchant, two schoolchildren, a teacher with her pupil, and a mechanic.

The art historian Vivien Green Fryd argues that the pediment sends the message that "Native Americans must be removed and extirpated, if necessary, for the continued progress of the United States." Other sculptures with similar implications, such as Horatio Greenough's The Rescue, were removed from the U.S. Capitol in the twentieth century because of their depiction of the white displacement of indigenous Americans. Crawford's pediment has not been subject to the same calls for removal.

References

Marble sculptures in Washington, D.C.
Outdoor sculptures in Washington, D.C.
United States Capitol statues
Pedimental sculpture
Sculptures of birds in the United States
Sculptures of Native Americans in Washington, D.C.
Sculptures of children in the United States